Jason Watts (born 29 July 1971) is a former Australian rules footballer who played with Footscray in the Victorian Football League (VFL).

Watts was recruited by Footscray on the back of his strong 1993 season at Werribee, when he won their best and fairest award in a premiership year. Picked up in the 1994 Pre-Season Draft, Watts appeared in 21 games for Footscray, including a qualifying final, in his first year at the club. He played as a small forward in 1996 and was the leading goal-kicker for the Bulldogs, with 44 goals from his 20 games. Over the next two years he added only five more games to his tally.

References

External links
 
 

1971 births
Australian rules footballers from Victoria (Australia)
Western Bulldogs players
Werribee Football Club players
Living people